Craig Snyder may refer to:

 Craig Snyder (writer), American poet, writer and photographer
 Craig Snyder (boxer) (born 1964), retired American boxer